Mount Selkirk is a  mountain summit located in the Vermilion River Valley along the eastern border of Kootenay National Park. Park visitors can see the peak from Highway 93, also known as the Banff–Windermere Highway. It is part of the Mitchell Range, which is a sub-range of the Canadian Rockies of British Columbia, Canada. The nearest higher neighbor is Catlin Peak,  to the northwest.

History
The mountain was named in 1886 by George Mercer Dawson in honor of Thomas Douglas, 5th Earl of Selkirk (1771-1820), a Scottish philanthropist who sponsored immigrant settlements at the Red River Colony in what is now Manitoba. The mountain's toponym was officially adopted in 1924 by the Geographical Names Board of Canada.

Geology
Mount Selkirk is composed principally of Ottertail limestone, sedimentary rock laid down during the Precambrian to Cambrian periods and pushed east and over the top of younger rock during the Laramide orogeny.

Climate
Based on the Köppen climate classification, Mount Selkirk is located in a subarctic climate zone with cold, snowy winters, and mild summers. Temperatures can drop below −20 °C with wind chill factors below −30 °C. Precipitation runoff from the mountain drains into tributaries of the Vermilion River.

See also
Geology of the Rocky Mountains
Geography of British Columbia

Gallery

References

External links
 Mount Selkirk: weather forecast
 Parks Canada web site: Kootenay National Park

Two-thousanders of British Columbia
Canadian Rockies
Kootenay Land District